Air Marshal Gurcharan Singh Bedi, AVSM,  VM, VSM is a retired officer of the Indian Air Force. He served as the Director General of Inspection and Flight Safety. He assumed the office on 1 February 2021 succeeding Air Marshal Manavendra Singh. Previously, he served as Senior Air Staff Officer of Eastern Air Command.

Early life and education 
Gurcharan Singh Bedi is an alumnus of  Defence Services Staff College and National Defence College.

Career
Gurcharan Singh Bedi was commissioned in the Indian Air Force as a fighter pilot on 8 June 1984. In a career spanning over 37 years, he has as over 3,700 hours of flying experience and is a qualified flying instructor and served as a fighter combat leader.

He has also commanded various front line bases along with peacekeeping mission in Democratic Republic of Congo.

Prior to his appointment as Director General of Inspection and Flight Safety, he served as Senior Air Staff Officer of Eastern Air Command.

Honours and decorations 
During his career, Gurcharan Singh Bedi  was awarded Ati Vishist Seva Medal in January 2020, Vayu Sena Medal in August 1999, Vishisht Seva Medal in 2010. for his service.

References 

Living people
Indian Air Force air marshals
National Defence Academy (India) alumni
Recipients of the Ati Vishisht Seva Medal
Recipients of the Vayu Sena Medal
Recipients of the Vishisht Seva Medal
Year of birth missing (living people)
Defence Services Staff College alumni
National Defence College, India alumni